The Zo'é people are a native tribe in the State of Pará, Municipality of Óbidos, on the Cuminapanema River, Brazil. They are a Tupi–Guarani people.

Name
They are also known as the Poturu, Poturujara, or Buré. The term "Zo'é" means "us," as opposed to non-Indians or enemies. The term "Poturu" is the type of wood used to make the embe'po labrets which they wear.

Language
The Zo'é language belongs to Subgroup VIII of the Tupi-Guarani language family.

Culture
All Zo'é wear the poturu, a wooden plug piercing the bottom lip. The Zo'é have a tradition where new fathers have the backs of their calves cut with the 'tooth of a small rodent'.

The marriage rituals of the Zo'é are complex and not fully understood. It is not known how many wives or husbands one is allowed to have. Many women practice polyandry. One or more husbands may be "learning husbands": young men learning how to be good spouses, in exchange for hunting for the rest of the family.

In film
The Salt of the Earth documents the work of photographer Sebastião Salgado including his photographs of the Zo'é.

Notes

Further reading

 Carelli, Vincent, and Dominique T. Gallois. Meeting ancestors The Zo'e. [Brazil]: Centro de Trabalho Indigenista, 1993.

External links

Associação de Apoio Mobilizado ao Povo Zo’é e Outras Etnias (Association of mobilized support to the Zo'e people and other ethnicity) 
 아마존의 눈물(Tears of Amazon) –  MBC 2010 special documentary

Indigenous peoples in Brazil
Indigenous peoples of the Amazon
Ethnic groups in Brazil